Audrey Whitty (born May 1977) is, as of February 2023, the director of the National Library of Ireland, She was deputy director of the National Museum of Ireland (NMI), a curator at the Corning Museum of Glass and a curator of glass and ceramics at the NMI.

Early life and education
Whitty is one of the three children of Eileen (née Stack) and Richard Whitty. She studied at University College Dublin, where she obtained a Bachelor of Arts in History and Archaeology, and a Masters in Archaeology. While working with the National Museum of Ireland, she was awarded a doctorate by the Trinity College Dublin. Her thesis about the donations of Albert Bender to the National Museum of Ireland was published as a book in 2011. Bender had given a significant collection to the museum in memory of his mother but for many years there was no space to display it.

Career
Whitty worked for the National Museum of Ireland (NMI) from 2001. She was curator of the ceramics, glass and Asian collections, in the Art and Industrial Division of the museum. In 2013, taking a career break, she went to work for the Corning Museum of Glass in New York state, as curator of European and Asian Glass. She returned to the NMI in 2015, as Keeper (Head) of the Art and Industrial Division, dealing with decorative arts, design and history.

In 2019, she was promoted to head all collections and educational operations of the National Museum, and in 2021, she was appointed as deputy director. Whitty was involved in the decision to remove Michael Collins' bloodied cap from display as it involved the exhibition of human remains. She curated the exhibition (A)Dressing Our Hidden Truths about the scandalous mother and baby homes and Magdalene laundries where thousands of children died. She was designated as the new director of the National Library of Ireland. She took up that office in February 2023, for a five year term.

Whitty is a trustee of the Stourbridge Glass Museum, and was from 2020 until February 2023 a member of the board of the North Lands Creative centre, a "centre for the study and development of glass as an artform" in Caithness.

Publications
Whitty has more than 70 publications, including a book and a peer-reviewed journal article:
 "The Albert Bender Collection of Asian Art in the National Museum of Ireland".
 "Frederick Carder’s Years at Stevens & Williams", Journal of Glass Studies, vol. 56, 2014, pp. 370–74

while other publications and contributions include:
 Book chapter: "The Industrial Design of Waterford Glass, 1947-c.1965", in J. M. Hearne (ed.) Glassmaking in Ireland: From the Medieval to the Contemporary. Dublin: Irish Academic Press, 2011, pp. 215-228
 Article: "Francòis-Eugène Rousseau: Pioneer of French Art Nouveau Glass", The Glass Society of Ireland Newsletter 29, 2002, pp. 3-4
 Article: "The Caspar Purdon Clarke Indian and Persian Collection of the National Museum of Ireland, 1878/’79", Museum Ireland 4, 2004, pp. 68-75
 Article: "The Golden Age of Irish Glass", Irish Arts Review, Summer 2012, pp. 124-127
 Brochure piece: "CultureCraft - Culture in the Making" (an exhibition of contemporary craft to mark Derry/Londonderry as UK Capital of Culture 2013) (ISBN : 978-1-906691-36-3) - pp. 26-29
 Review of: "From Pupil to Master": a contemporary glass exhibition at the Solomon Fine Art Gallery, Dublin (12-27 October 2012); in Glass Network: The CGS Quarterly Magazine, Issue 47 (March 2013), p. 13

Personal life
Whitty is married, with at least one daughter.

References 

1977 births
Alumni of University College Dublin
Alumni of Trinity College Dublin
Irish librarians
Women librarians
Living people